Myra Falls, also known as Lower Myra Falls, is a waterfall located at the southern end of Buttle Lake on Vancouver Island in British Columbia. The falls are protected within Strathcona-Westmin Provincial Park.

Description
Myra Falls is a seven-tiered plunge waterfall that cascades down into the southern end of Buttle Lake from a small hanging valley. The falls are accessible to the public via a paved road to the Myra Falls mine gate followed by an easy  hiking trail downstream. The falls are also accessible by boat via Buttle Lake.

Upper Myra Falls

History
The falls and Myra Creek were named for Myra Ellison, daughter of Price Ellison who was part of the exploratory survey in 1910 that preceded the creation of Strathcona Provincial Park.

See also
Della Falls

References

External links

Video showcasing Upper Myra Falls, 2019

Waterfalls of British Columbia
Clayoquot Land District